Ans Bouwmeester is a Dutch Paralympic athlete. She won three gold medals at the 1984 Summer Paralympics. She won the gold medal in the women's 200 metre C3 event, in the women's discus throw C4 event and in the women's shot put C4 event. She also won the silver medal in the women's 60 metre C3 event.

In 1988, she won the gold medal in the women's shot put C4 event at the Summer Paralympics held in Seoul, South Korea.

References

External links 
 

Living people
Year of birth missing (living people)
Place of birth missing (living people)
Paralympic gold medalists for the Netherlands
Paralympic silver medalists for the Netherlands
Paralympic medalists in athletics (track and field)
Athletes (track and field) at the 1984 Summer Paralympics
Athletes (track and field) at the 1988 Summer Paralympics
Medalists at the 1984 Summer Paralympics
Medalists at the 1988 Summer Paralympics
Paralympic athletes of the Netherlands
Dutch female sprinters
Dutch female discus throwers
Dutch female shot putters
20th-century Dutch women